Oh My God is an American rock band from Chicago, Illinois, United States, that formed in 1999.

Oh My God's most recent album, The Night Undoes The Work Of The Day, was released on September 29, 2009, along with a US tour to promote it.

When recording Fools Want Noise!, the band experimented with new styles, adding guitars to the songs "Facewash" and "Put It in a Song". Kerrang! magazine quoted:
"The addition of a guitar into the mix has worked to their advantage, particularly on the anthemic 'Facewash' and soulful shred of 'Put It in a Song'."

The band signed with a new record label, Split Red Records, shortly before recording this album. Shortly before the release of this album, the band toured around the US.

Discography

EPs
Oh My God EP (2000)

Studio albums
Well (2001)
Action! (2002)
Interrogations and Confessions (2003)
You're Too Straight to Love Me (2004)
Fools Want Noise! (2008)
The Night Undoes The Work Of The Day (2009)

References

Indie rock musical groups from Illinois
Musical groups established in 2000
Musical groups from Chicago